The 1990 SMU Mustangs football team represented Southern Methodist University (SMU) as a member of the Southwest Conference (SWC) during the 1990 NCAA Division I-A football season. Led by Forrest Gregg in his second and final year as head coach, the Mustangs compiled an overall record of 1–10 with a mark of 0–8 in conference play, placing last out of nine teams in the SWC. SMU opened the season with a 44–7 win over Vanderbilt, but struggled the remainder of the season still recovering from the NCAA's death penalty, which barred SMU from competing in 1987 and 1988. The Mustangs offense scored 197 points while the defense allowed 426 points. Gregg, who retired after the season to serve full-time as SMU's athletic director, was carried off the field following a loss to Arkansas in the season finale.

Schedule

References

SMU
SMU Mustangs football seasons
SMU Mustangs football